Franz Henry Federschmidt (February 21, 1894 – April 14, 1956) was an American rower who competed in the 1920 Summer Olympics. In 1920 he was part of the American boat, which won the silver medal in the coxed fours event.

References

External links
Franz Federschmidt's profile at databaseOlympics

1894 births
1956 deaths
Olympic silver medalists for the United States in rowing
Rowers at the 1920 Summer Olympics
American male rowers
Medalists at the 1920 Summer Olympics